Cawein is a surname. Notable people with the surname include:

Kathrin Cawein (1895–1996), American printmaker and etcher
Kathrin Cawein Gallery of Art
Madison Cawein (1865–1914), American poet